Belgian may refer to:
 Something of, or related to, Belgium
 Belgians, people from Belgium or of Belgian descent
 Languages of Belgium, languages spoken in Belgium, such as Dutch, French, and German
Ancient Belgian language, an extinct language formerly spoken in Gallia Belgica
Belgian Dutch or Flemish, a variant of Dutch
Belgian French, a variant of French
Belgian horse (disambiguation), various breeds of horse
Belgian waffle, in culinary contexts
SS Belgian, a cargo ship in service with F Leyland & Co Ltd from 1919 to 1934
The Belgian, a 1917 American silent film

See also

Belgica (disambiguation)
Belgic (disambiguation)